Radka Zrubáková was the defending champion, but did not compete this year.

Judith Wiesner won the title by defeating Naoko Sawamatsu 6–1, 6–3 in the final.

Seeds
The first four seeds received a bye to the second round.

Draw

Finals

Top half

Bottom half

References

External links
 Official results archive (ITF)
 Official results archive (WTA)

Internationaux de Strasbourgandnbsp;- Singles
1992 Singles
1992 in French tennis